Jiří Votruba (born December 8, 1946, in Prague, Czechoslovakia) is a Czech painter, illustrator, and graphic designer - artist with characteristic style.  His paintings were presented at almost 50 exhibitions all around the world. His work is divided into various themes (e.g. swimming pools, shoes, etc.), in recent years he is fascinated by consumer society and its attractivity.

Illustrations of this artist are connected especially with the literature for kids. The most successful one was a book, which introduced children to the world of opera.

Graphical design of Jiří Votruba is easily recognizable. He is well known for his works with theme of historical Prague. His design works dedicated to classical music get a lot of attention especially in Japan.

He is also known for his artwork commonly found on t-shirts, mugs, and posters in shops throughout Prague, Czech Republic including depictions of Franz Kafka, Mozart, and various Prague scenes and themes.

Solo exhibitions 

2017 » Garden Gallery, Kolín, CZ
2017 » New Scene Gallery of National Theatre, Prague, CZ
2017 » Southbohemian Philharmony, České Budějovice, CZ
2016 » Czech center Paris, France
2015 » Gallery Kryt, Klášterec nad Ohří, CZ
2015 » Levantehaus, Hamburg, Germany
2015 » Czech Center Tokyo, The Book of Piano
2015 » Gallery of Czech center, Paris, France
2014 » Gallery Budoart, Prague, CZ
2013 » Otto Guttfreund gallery, Dvůr Králové, CZ
2012 » Summer Cut, Galerie 1. patro, Prague, CZ
2012 » Gallery Kryt, Klášterec nad Ohří, CZ
2011 » Al Bustan Festival, Beirut, Lebanon
2011 » City Concert Hall, Niagata, Japan
2011 » Things Will Never Be The Same, Galerie Českých Center, Prague, CZ
2010 » Praha City Center, Prague, CZ
2010 » Kanazawa Concert Hall, Kanazawa, Japan
2009 » Kleisthaus, Berlin, Germany (with M. Kaufman and L. Klimentová)
2009 » Gallery of Prefecture Ishikawa, Kanazawa, Japan
2008 » UMU Gallery, Tokyo, Japan
2008 » Městská galerie, Litvínov, CZ
2008 » French Institute, Chartoum, Sudan
2008 » Galerie kritiků, Prague, CZ
2008 » Galerie V kapli, Bruntál, CZ
2008 » České centrum Bratislava, Slovakia
2007 » Gallery Horizone One, Cairo, Egypt
2007 » Tokyo International Forum, Japan
2007 » Galerie Bayer & Bayer, Prague, CZ
2006 » UMU Gallery, Tokyo, Japan
2006 » Al Bustan Festival, Beirut, Libanon
2006 » Galerie Pintner, Frankfurt am Main, Germany
2005 » Východočeská galerie, Pardubice, CZ
2004 » Raiffeisenbank, Prague, CZ
2003 » Levantehaus, Hamburg, Germany
2002 » Gallery Sumithra at ART PRAGUE 2002
2002 » Kabinet, Prague, CZ
2002 » Jazz Festival Hradec Kralové, CZ
2002 » Galerie Bayer & Bayer, Prague, CZ
2001 » Gut Altentann Club, Salzburg, Austria
2001 » Int. Hopkins Summer Festival, Kildare, Ireland

References

External links
  Official Page

Artists from Prague
Living people
1946 births